Limnophilomyia is a genus of crane flies in the family Limoniidae.

Distribution
All are from Africa south of the Sahara Desert.

Species
Subgenus Eulimnophilomyia Alexander, 1964
L. abnormalis Alexander, 1964
Subgenus Limnophilomyia Alexander, 1921
L. edwardsomyia Alexander, 1956
L. flavidula Alexander, 1976
L. lacteitarsis (Alexander, 1921)
L. matengoensis Alexander, 1970
L. medleriana Alexander, 1976
L. nigeriensis Alexander, 1974
L. nigripennis Alexander, 1976
L. niveipes Alexander, 1956
L. stuckenbergi Alexander, 1956
L. transvaalensis Alexander, 1958

References

Limoniidae
Tipulomorpha genera
Diptera of Africa